Virgilijus Juozas Čepaitis (8 November 1937 in Šakiai, Lithuania) is a Lithuanian publisher and translator, best known for his involvement in the Sąjūdis independence movement. He was the Executive Secretary of Sąjūdis and a member of its Initiative Group. He was also a signatory of the Declaration of the Restoration of Independence of Lithuania on 11 March 1990.

In 1961 Čepaitis graduated from Moscow's Maxim Gorky Literature Institute. Čepaitis is married to Auksuolė Čepaitienė. They have three children and live in Vilnius, Lithuania.

Positions held
1958–1988 – free-lance translator;
1988–1989 – the chief-editor of the film company "ARS";
1989–1990 – the executive secretary of the Sąjūdis Movement;
1990–1992 – Member of Parliament and Chairman of the Committee for Civil Rights and Ethnic Minorities;
Chairman of the Sąjūdis faction, the member of the Lithuanian delegation in the negotiations with Russia in 1990–1991. Head of the Lithuanian delegation in the non-official negotiations with the Soviet Union in Hague, organised by De Burght consultations, 1991;
1993–1996 – the chief-editor of the publishing company "Litera";
1996–2001 – the director of the publishing company "Tvermė".
Since 2001 – the owner of the publishing company "Librum"

Social and political positions
Since 1968 – member of the Lithuanian Writers' Union;
1988 – member of the Initiative Group of the Lithuanian Reform Movement (Sąjūdis);
1988–1990 – member of the Sąjūdis' Seimas Council;
1989–1994 – Chairman of the Lithuania-Poland Association;
1990–1992 – Chairman of the Independence Party;
1990–1992 – Chairman of Stasys Šalkauskis Cultural Foundation;
Since 2003 – member of Lithuanian Translators Union.
Since 1993 – member of the Association of Signatories of the Independence Act

Literary works

He is the author of a screenplay for the film Virto ąžuolai (Oak Trees Fell; 1976).

Awards
The Medal of Lithuanian Independence (awarded on July 1, 2000)
The Award of Commemoration of Lithuania's Membership of NATO (awarded on July 25, 2002)

References
 . Virgilijus Juozas Čepaitis. Seimas of the Republic of Lithuania.
"Su Sąjūdžiu už Lietuvą" ("With Sąjūdis for Lithuania", in Lithuanian) by Virgilijus Čepaitis, 2007, 470 pp.

1937 births
Lithuanian publishers (people)
Lithuanian politicians
Lithuanian translators
Translators from English
Translators from Lithuanian
Translators to Lithuanian
Translators to Russian
Living people
People from Šakiai
Maxim Gorky Literature Institute alumni
Signatories of the Act of the Re-Establishment of the State of Lithuania